Zor al-Haysa al-Sharqiyah is a Syrian village located in the Suran Subdistrict in Hama District. According to the Syria Central Bureau of Statistics (CBS), Zor al-Haysa al-Sharqiyah had a population of 768 in the 2004 census.

References 

Populated places in Hama District